The boys' sprint freestyle cross-country skiing competition at the 2012 Winter Youth Olympics was held on 19 January at the Seefeld Arena.

Results

Qualification
The qualification was held at 16:00.

Quarterfinals
Quarterfinal 1

Quarterfinal 2

Quarterfinal 3

Quarterfinal 4

Quarterfinal 5

Semifinals
Semifinal 1

Semifinal 2

Final

References

External links 
olympedia.org

Boys' sprnt